The 2002 Wirral Metropolitan Borough Council election took place on 2 May 2002 to elect members of Wirral Metropolitan Borough Council in England. This election was held on the same day as other local elections.

After the election, the composition of the council was:

Election results

Overall election result

Overall result compared with 2000.

Ward results

Bebington

Bidston

Birkenhead

Bromborough

Clatterbridge

Claughton

Eastham

Egerton

Heswall

Hoylake

Leasowe

Liscard

Moreton

New Brighton

Oxton

Prenton

Royden

Seacombe

Thurstaston

Tranmere

Upton

Wallasey

Changes between 2000 and 2002

Prenton by-election 2003

Notes

• italics denote the sitting councillor • bold denotes the winning candidate

References

2002 English local elections
2002
2000s in Merseyside